Jamaica was represented at the 2006 Commonwealth Games in Melbourne.

Medals

Medalists

Bronze
 Athletics, Men's 4 × 400 m Relay

Gold
 Asafa Powell, Athletics, Men's 100 m
 Sheri-Ann Brooks, Athletics, Women's 100 m
 Maurice Wignall, Athletics, Men's 110 m Hurdles
 Trecia Smith, Athletics, Women's Triple Jump
 Tanto Campbell, Athletics, Men's Seated Discus Throw EAD
 Omar Brown, Athletics, Men's 200 m
 Sherone Simpson, Athletics, Women's 200 m
 Brigitte Foster-Hylton, Athletics, Women's 100 m Hurdles
 Athletics, Men's 4 × 100 m Relay
 Athletics, Women's 4 × 100 m Relay

See also
Jamaica at the 2004 Summer Olympics
Jamaica at the 2007 Pan American Games
Jamaica at the 2008 Summer Olympics

2006
Nations at the 2006 Commonwealth Games
Commonwealth Games